The Javelin 38 is a Dutch sailboat that was designed by American naval architect William H. Tripp Jr. as a cruiser and first built in 1960.

Production
The design was built by de Vries Lentsch from 1960 until 1966, with about 25 boats completed, but it is now out of production. Most of the boats produced were imported into the United States by Seafarer Yachts.

Design
The Javelin 38 is a recreational keelboat, built predominantly of fiberglass, with wood trim. The hull has a spooned, raked stem; a raised counter, plumb transom and a fixed fin keel. It displaces  and carries  of ballast.

The boat is fitted with a Universal Atomic 4  gasoline engine for docking and maneuvering.

See also
List of sailing boat types

References

External links

Photo of a Javelin 38 yawl, showing hull shape

Keelboats
1960s sailboat type designs
Sailing yachts
Sailboat type designs by William H. Tripp Jr.
Sailboat types built by De Vries Lentsch